1261 Legia, provisional designation , is a dark Themistian asteroid from the outer regions of the asteroid belt, approximately 32 kilometers in diameter. It was discovered on 23 March 1933, by astronomer Eugène Delporte at the Royal Observatory of Belgium in Uccle. The asteroid was named for the Belgian city of Liège (Luke).

Orbit and classification 

Legia is a Themistian asteroid that belongs to the Themis family, a very large family of carbonaceous asteroids, named after 24 Themis. It is, however, a non-family asteroid of the main belt's background population when applying the hierarchical clustering method to its proper orbital elements.

It orbits the Sun in the outer asteroid belt at a distance of 2.6–3.7 AU once every 5 years and 7 months (2,030 days; semi-major axis of 3.14 AU). Its orbit has an eccentricity of 0.18 and an inclination of 2° with respect to the ecliptic.

The body's observation arc begins at Uccle in March 1933, five days after its official discovery observation.

Physical characteristics 

Legia has been characterized as a primitive and reddish P-type asteroid by the Wide-field Infrared Survey Explorer (WISE).

Rotation period 

In January 2005, a rotational lightcurve of Legia was obtained from photometric observations by French amateur astronomer Laurent Bernasconi. Lightcurve analysis gave a rotation period of 8.693 hours with a brightness amplitude of 0.13 magnitude.

Diameter and albedo 

According to the surveys carried out by the Infrared Astronomical Satellite IRAS, the Japanese Akari satellite and the NEOWISE mission of NASA's WISE telescope, Legia measures between 31.26 and 36.56 kilometers in diameter and its surface has an albedo between 0.048 and 0.0719.

The Collaborative Asteroid Lightcurve Link derives an albedo of 0.0601 and a diameter of 31.20 kilometers based on an absolute magnitude of 11.2.

Naming 

This minor planet was named "Legia", the Latin name of the Belgian city of Liège (Luik). The official naming citation was mentioned in The Names of the Minor Planets by Paul Herget in 1955.

References

External links 
 Asteroid Lightcurve Database (LCDB), query form (info )
 Dictionary of Minor Planet Names, Google books
 Asteroids and comets rotation curves, CdR – Observatoire de Genève, Raoul Behrend
 Discovery Circumstances: Numbered Minor Planets (1)-(5000) – Minor Planet Center
 
 

001261
Discoveries by Eugène Joseph Delporte
Named minor planets
19330323